Efremenkov or Yefremenkov is a Russian masculine surname, its feminine counterpart is Efremenkova or Yefremenkova. It may refer to
Ekaterina Efremenkova (born 1997), Russian speed skater
Feodosiy Efremenkov (born 1996), Russian figure skater

Russian-language surnames